The 2012–13 William & Mary Tribe men's basketball team represented The College of William & Mary during the 2012–13 NCAA Division I men's basketball season. The Tribe, led by tenth year head coach Tony Shaver, played their home games at Kaplan Arena and were members of the Colonial Athletic Association. They finished the regular season 13–16 overall and 7–11 in CAA conference play to finish in eighth place. They lost to James Madison in the quarterfinals of the CAA tournament. Following the season, sophomore guard Marcus Thornton was named to the second team all-CAA while junior forward Tim Rusthoven was named to the third team all-CAA.

Preseason
The CAA coaches preseason poll, released on October 16, predicted William & Mary to finish in ninth place in the CAA. Guard Marcus Thornton, a sophomore, was selected to the preseason all conference second team.

Roster

Schedule and results

|-
!colspan=9| Regular Season

|-
!colspan=9| 2013 CAA men's basketball tournament

References

William and Mary Tribe
William & Mary Tribe men's basketball seasons
William and Mary Tribe
William and Mary Tribe